Dendropsophus novaisi is a species of frog in the family Hylidae.
It is endemic to Brazil.
Its natural habitats are dry savanna, moist savanna, intermittent freshwater marshes, and rocky areas.
It is threatened by habitat loss.

References

Sources

novaisi
Endemic fauna of Brazil
Amphibians described in 1968
Taxonomy articles created by Polbot